IC Catholic Prep (ICCP) is a private, Roman Catholic high school in Elmhurst, Illinois, and located in the Roman Catholic Diocese of Joliet in Illinois. When opened in 1936, it was the only co-educational secondary institution in DuPage County. The Sisters of St. Agnes have offered a curriculum incorporating a college prep focus since its founding. It is the oldest Catholic, coeducational high school in DuPage County, Illinois. It is also the only parish-based high school in DuPage County.

In January 2013, IC High School was renamed IC Catholic Prep to reflect the school's pursuit and teaching of Catholic values.

Pulling from more than 38 different suburban communities, ICCP has an average class size 19:1.

Courses 
IC Catholic Prep offers 25+ Advanced Placement and Honors classes in addition to its regular course offerings. ICCP offers extracurricular activities including National Honor Society, Art club, Book club, Engineering Club, Theater, Math Team, Student Council, and Yearbook.

Vision 
IC Catholic Prep's official vision is "Young men and women who learn, lead, and serve."

Philosophy 
Through a Catholic, college preparatory curriculum, students are encouraged to achieve their maximum potential and exemplify the Catholic values taught at IC Catholic Prep. Faculty, staff, administration, students and parents strive to work together to form a loving, Christ-centered community of believers. Students will encounter diversity of mind and culture, excel academically, and experience personal growth through their academic and extracurricular experiences. Students will be challenged to become independent thinkers who make a positive impact on the world through a selfless confidence and service to others.

Athletics 
The Football Program has won 6 IHSA State Championships spanning from 2002 to 2022. Years (and divisions) of championships: 2002(3A), 2008(2A), 2016(3A), 2017(3A), 2018(4A), 2022(3A). In 2008, the Immaculate Conception football team became the first 4 loss football team in IHSA history to win a state championship, winning the class 2a football state championship. The 2008 football state championship squad posted a record of 10 wins and 4 losses, winning their final 6 games.

The Dance Team won state in 2012 and placed second in state in 2013. In 2016 the dance team also placed top ten at the IHSA state competition and placed first and second at every competition they attended.

The Volleyball Team won the IHSA class 2A State Championship in 2013.

In 2018, the Wrestling Team qualified for the IHSA Class 1A Team State Finals for the first time in school history.

Notable alumni
 Bob McMillen, Former arena football player and head football coach
 Skip Pitlock, Former MLB player (San Francisco Giants, Chicago White Sox)
 Clark Brinkman (Class of 2014), Drafted by the Detroit Tigers in the 32nd round of the 2018 MLB Draft

Notes and references

External links
 School website
 Athletics website

Roman Catholic Diocese of Joliet in Illinois
Catholic secondary schools in Illinois
Elmhurst, Illinois
Educational institutions established in 1936
Schools in DuPage County, Illinois
1936 establishments in Illinois